Fakhruzzaman Chowdhury (5 January 1940 – 12 June 2014) was a Bangladeshi author. He served as the director of Bangladesh Television. He was awarded Bangla Academy Literary Award, the highest literary award in Bangladesh in 2005.

Early life and education
Fakhruzzaman was born in 1940 in a reputed family in Comilla. He completed his secondary studies at Jagannath College in 1957, honors from Dhaka University in 1960 and masters in 1961 from the same university.

Career
After completing his studies, Fakhruzzaman Chowdhury joined as a research fellow in Dhaka University. Then he became the director of Bangladesh Television. During thus time, he became a professional writer and translator. He primarily wrote child literature. He went on to write over 30 books.

Literary Works

Poetry
Anabaz (1986)
Door Diganta (1986)
Palestine Protirodher Golpo (1994)

Novels
Jonaronye Koyekjon (1990)
Eka O Ekaki (1994)

Dramas
Yarma (1991)

Articles
Lekhoker Kotha: Part 1 (1992)
Lekhoker Kotha: Part 2 (2003)

Child literature
Haar Kipte Buri (1956)
Rip Van Winkle (1956)
In The Court of King Arther (1968)
King of Magic Hudini (1988)
Uncle Tom's Cabin (1993)
Around The World In 80 Days (1993)
Hunchbeck of Notre Dame (1995)
Treasure Island (1998)

Biography
Dilan Thomas (1985)
Ali Ashraf Khan (1988)
Azizur Rahman (1989)

History
Abichar (1984)
Oirabot O Ankush (1993)

Translation
Bikikinir Prem (1992)
He Dukkho Biday (1993)
Robinson Crussoe (2006)

Personal life
Fakhruzzaman Chowdhury was married to television actress Dilara Zaman. He was the elder brother of renowned poet and lyricist Ahmed Zaman Chowdhury, who has written some timeless songs for Bangladeshi films.

Death
Fakhruzzaman Chowdhury breathed his last on 12 June 2014 at the age of 74. His wife Dilara Zaman confirmed that he had suffered from chronic obstructive pulmonary disease.

Awards
Bangla Academy Literary Award (translation) – 2005
Agrani Bank Child Literature Award – 1993

References

1940 births
2014 deaths
Bangladeshi writers
University of Dhaka alumni
People from Comilla District
20th-century Bangladeshi male writers
Bangladeshi male novelists
Bangladeshi translators
Recipients of Bangla Academy Award
20th-century Bengalis